Microlepidoptera (micromoths) is an artificial (i.e., unranked and not monophyletic) grouping of moth families, commonly known as the 'smaller moths' (micro, Lepidoptera). These generally have wingspans of under 20 mm, and are thus harder to identify by external phenotypic markings than macrolepidoptera. They present some lifestyles which the larger Lepidoptera do not have, but this is not an identifying mark. Some hobbyists further divide this group into separate groups, such as leaf miners or rollers, stem or root borers, and then usually follow the more rigorous scientific taxonomy of lepidopterans. Efforts to stabilize the term have usually proven inadequate.

Diversity 

Vernacular usage divides the Lepidoptera simply into smaller and larger or into more-primitive and less-primitive groups: microlepidoptera and macrolepidoptera, respectively. Intuitively, the "micros" are any lepidopteran not currently placed in the macrolepidoptera. This paraphyletic assemblage, however, includes also the superfamilies Zygaenoidea, Sesioidea and Cossoidea that would in common parlance normally be lumped with the "macros". A lepidopterist might call these groups 'primitive macros'. Furthermore, even all of the nonditrysian moths are not small. For example, the Hepialidae or "swift moths" (up to 25 cm wingspan) fall quite basally in the lepidopteran "tree of life". The recently discovered primitive superfamily Andesianoidea is another case in point: lurking within the Cossoidae until 2001, these moths have up to an order of magnitude greater wingspan (5.5 cm) than most previously known monotrysian "micros". Whilst the smaller moths are usually also more seldom noticed, a more expansive "non-macrolepidopteran" concept of the microlepidoptera would include about 37 out of the approximately 47 superfamilies.

Whilst usually less popular, micros are thus more important in the sense that they include a much wider span of the "tree of life" (i.e., phylogenetic diversity). Whereas they include no butterflies, micros do also include a surprising number of day-flying groups, and the advent of online identification resources in many countries (e.g. "UK moths") combined with the widespread use of digital macrophotography, is making them much easier to identify.

Life style 

Microlepidoptera can be found in a broad variety of habitats and ecological niches worldwide, both terrestrial and freshwater aquatic (e.g. Acentropinae).  They have a wide variety of feeding habits in both larval and adult life stages. Caterpillars feed on a wide variety of plant tissue and across a wide spectrum of plant groups from liverworts to angiosperms. They are either external feeders ("exophagous") or more usually feed internally ("endophagous"), typically as miners or tunnellers, but some feed on fungi, scavenge on dead animals, are parasitoids usually of other insects (some Zygaenoidea) or are detritivores, and Hyposmocoma molluscivora even feeds on live snails. Adult moths feed with mandibles on spores and pollen (Micropterigidae) on dew (e.g. Eriocraniidae), with their proboscises on nectar (many groups e.g. Choreutidae) or are simply nonfeeding with mouthparts reduced or absent. The larvae of many smaller moths are considered economic pests, causing damage to plants, as well as fabrics and other man-made goods. Commonly noticed "micros" include the plume moth and the various species of clothes moth.

Main groups 

The list below is ordered initially in approximate order of species diversity and ecological abundance. The first four superfamilies listed here may comprise 90% of species in a sample of smaller moths and the listed characters may be of some assistance to sort these out, particularly the form of the labial palp and scaling of the proboscis (Robinson et al. 2001).

1. Curved horn moths, twirler moths, case-bearers and allies – 16,250 spp.

 Gelechioidea: Head smooth-scaled, labial palps usually are slender, recurved, with the terminal segment long and pointed; the long proboscis bears scales on basal half. Resting posture very varied.
 Gelechiidae – twirler moths
 Oecophoridae – concealer moths
 Lecithoceridae – tropical longhorned moths
 Cosmopterigidae – cosmet moths
 Coleophoridae – case-bearers
 Elachistidae – grass-miner miners
 Momphidae – mompha moths
 Ethmiidae
 Blastobasidae – scavenger moths
 Batrachedridae – flower moths
 Scythrididae – flower moths
 Pterolonchidae – lance-wing moths
 Symmocidae
 Agonoxenidae – palm moths
 Holcopogonidae
 Metachandidae

2. Pyralids, snout moths and grass moths – 16,000 spp.

 Pyraloidea: Head rough-scaled, proboscis scaled, tympanal organs on abdomen; labial palps usually not recurved, terminal segment usually blunt. Hindwing veins ("Sc" + "R1") and "Rs" are close or fused in the middle of the wing; resting posture usually either with wings tightly rolled or and held quite flat to surface in triangular shape and with labial palps often projecting forward, giving Concorde-like appearance; antennae often swept back parallel together over body. Generally they are considered the closest group to 'macrolepidoptera', and maybe ancestral to it, macrolepidoptera itself is not a universally accepted taxon.
 Pyralidae – pyrales or snout moths
 Crambidae – grass moths

3. Tortrix moths, leaf-roller moths, bell moths, codling moths and allies – 6,200 spp.

 Tortricidae: Head rough-scaled, labial palps with short blunt apical segment, basal half of proboscis not scaled; wings held over back in tent-like or flattened position; forewing costa often quite strongly convex or sinuate in many Tortricinae giving bell-like shape

4. Clothes moths, bagworms and allies – 4,200 spp.

 Tineoidea: Head often with tufty erect scales; labial palps usually have bristles on middle segment and terminal segment is long; wings usually held over back in tent-like position and head close to surface; tineids often run fast
 Tineidae – clothes moths and fungus moths
 Eriocottidae – Old World spiny winged moths
 Acrolophidae – tube moths
 Arrhenophanidae – tropical lattice moths
 Psychidae – bagworm moths
 Lypusidae – European bagworm moths

5, 6. Leaf miner moths – 3,200 spp.

 Gracillarioidea – 2,300 spp.
 Gracillariidae – blotch leaf miner moths
 Bucculatricidae – ribbed cocoon makers
 Douglasiidae – Douglas moths
 Roeslerstammiidae – double-eye moths
 Nepticuloidea – 900 spp. - eyecap moths
 Nepticulidae – pygmy eyecap moths
 Opostegidae – white eyecap moths

7. Ermine moths, webworm moths, yucca moths and allies – 1,500 spp.

 Yponomeutoidea
 Yponomeutidae – ermine moths
 Acrolepiidae – false diamond-back moths
 Ypsolophidae
 Plutellidae – diamond-back moths and allies
 Glyphipterigidae – sedge moths
 Heliodinidae – sun moths
 Bedelliidae
 Lyonetiidae – lyonet moths

8, 9. Plume moths – 1,160 spp.

 Pterophoridae – plume moths – 1,000 spp.
 Alucitidae – many-plumed moths – 160 spp.

10. Tropical leaf moths or picture-winged moths – more than 1000 spp.

 Thyrididae: Small mainly dayflying moths:

11. Fairy moths, longhorn moths and allies – 600 spp.

 Adeloidea
 Incurvariidae – leaf-cutter moths
 Adelidae – fairy moths
 Heliozelidae – shield-bearer leaf-miners
 Prodoxidae – yucca moths
 Cecidosidae – gall moths

12. Metalmark moths – 402 spp.

 Choreutidae

13. Mandibulate archaic moths – 180 spp.

 Micropterigidae

14. Sparkling archaic sun moths or spring jewel moths – 24 spp.

 Eriocraniidae

Superfamilies less likely to be encountered:

15. Tropical fruitworm moths – 318 spp.

 Copromorphoidea
 Copromorphidae
 Carposinidae

16. Fringe tufted moths – 83 spp.

 Epermeniidae

17. Blackberry leaf skeletonizer and allies – 8 spp.

 Schreckensteiniidae

18. Immid moths – 250 spp.

 Immidae

19. False burnet moths – 60 spp.

 Urodidae

20. Tropical teak moths – 20 spp.

 Hyblaeidae

21. Whalley's Malagasy moths – 2 spp.

 Whalleyanidae

More rarely encountered "primitive" families:

22. Kauri pine moths – 2 spp.

 Agathiphagidae

22. Southern beech moths or Valdivian archaic moths – 9 spp.

 Heterobathmiidae

23. Archaic sun moths – 4 spp.

 Acanthopteroctetidae

24. Australian archaic sun moths – 6 spp.

 Lophocoronidae

25. Archaic bell moths – 12 spp.

 Neopseustidae

26. New Zealand endemic moths – 7 spp.

 Mnesarchaeidae

27. Gondwanaland moths – 60 spp.

 Palaephatidae

28. Trumpet leaf miner moths – 107 spp.

 Tischeriidae

29. Simaethistid moths – 4 spp.

 Simaethistidae

30. Galacticoid moths or webworm moths – 17 spp.

 Galacticidae

Larger "micros" 

These groups have been formerly included in macros by hobbyists. 'Archaic and primitive macros' is not a recommended name for these as it may create confusion of their placement in some classification systems.

31. Swift moths and allies – 544 spp.

 Hepialoidea
 Hepialidae – swift moths
 Anomosetidae – Australian primitive ghost moths
 Prototheoridae – African primitive ghost moths
 Neotheoridae – Amazonian primitive ghost moths
 Palaeosetidae – miniature ghost moths

Unassigned to superfamily:

32. Meyrick's mystic moth – 1 sp.

 Prodidactidae

Large monotrysian micros:

33. Andean endemic moths – 3 spp.

 Andesianidae

Large ditrysian micros (formerly 'primitive macros'):

34. Burnet moths, slug moths, hag moths, glass moths and allies – 2,600 spp.

 Zygaenoidea
 Zygaenidae – burnet and forester moths
 Limacodidae – slug moths or saddleback caterpillar moths
 Megalopygidae – flannel moths
 Epipyropidae – planthopper parasite moths
 Heterogynidae – Mediterranean burnet moths
 Himantopteridae – long-tailed burnet moths
 Anomoeotidae
 Cyclotornidae – Australian parasite moths
 Somabrachyidae – African flannel moths
 Dalceridae – glass moths
 Lacturidae – Australian burnet moths
 Aididae

35. Clearwing moths, castniid moths, little bear moths and allies – 1,300 spp.

 Sesioidea
 Sesiidae – clearwing moths
 Castniidae – castniid moths
 Brachodidae – little bear moths

36, 37. Goat or carpenter moths and allies – 676 spp.

 Cossoidea
 Cossidae – goat moths, leopard moths or carpenterworm moths
 Dudgeoneidae – Dudgeon carpenterworm moths

Sources 

 Robinson, G.S., Tuck, K.R., Shaffer, M. and Cook, K. (1994). The smaller moths of South-East Asia. Malaysian Nature Society, Kuala Lumpur.
 Common Name Index

Moth taxonomy
Polyphyletic groups